Honey Creek Township is a township in Henry County, in the U.S. state of Missouri.

Honey Creek Township was established in 1873, taking its name from Honey Creek.

References

Townships in Missouri
Townships in Henry County, Missouri